Paratassa is a genus of beetles in the family Buprestidae, containing the following species:

 Paratassa acuminata Bily & Volkovitsh, 1996
 Paratassa aegyptiaca Bily & Volkovitsh, 1996
 Paratassa agadeziaca Bily, 2004
 Paratassa arabica Bily & Volkovitsh, 1996
 Paratassa aurulenta Bily & Volkovitsh, 1996
 Paratassa coraebiformis (Fairmaire, 1875)
 Paratassa medioatlassica Bily & Volkovitsh, 1996
 Paratassa meridionalis Bily & Volkovitsh, 1996
 Paratassa occidentalis Bily & Volkovitsh, 1996
 Paratassa orientalis Bily & Volkovitsh, 1996
 Paratassa ringenbachi LIberto & Gigli, 2005
 Paratassa tunesiaca Bily & Volkovitsh, 1996

References

Buprestidae genera